Municipal elections were held in Kosovo on November 17, 2007, at the same time as elections to the Assembly of Kosovo, with a second round for the mayoral elections held on 2007-12-08. The date was originally set for September 1, 2007 by the Special Representative of the Secretary-General of the United Nations, Joachim Rücker (head of the United Nations Interim Administration Mission in Kosovo).

The elections were held in Kosovo's thirty municipalities, and for the first time, local mayors were directly elected.

Joachim Rücker decided not to officially recognise the election results in mainly Serb-populated municipalities where Albanians were elected due to the Serb election boycott.

Main contenders 
Three Kosovo Serb lists registered for the election very early:
Multi-Ethnic Council of Plemetin
Kosovo Movement
Civil Initiative for Novo Brdo and Zubin Potok

In total, 50 lists participated the elections. Many of the lists participating in the local elections were Serbian, as opposed to the parliamentary elections, where only eight Serbian lists participated.

Alliances
The Democratic Party of Kosovo, which won the Assembly election, and the New Kosovo Alliance agreed in early December 2007, prior to the second round of the elections, to form coalitions at the local level wherever possible.

Results
The results of the mayoral elections in the thirty municipalities were as follows:
Democratic Party of Kosovo (PDK): 17 mayors
Democratic League of Kosovo (LDK): 7 mayors
Alliance for the Future of Kosovo (AAK): 3 mayors

Due to the Kosovan Serbs' election boycott, no run-off election was held in Leposavić, Zubin Potok and Zvečan.

According to the final results, party control of the municipal councils is as follows:
Democratic Party of Kosovo (PDK): 14 municipal council presidents
Democratic League of Kosovo (LDK): 6 municipal council presidents
Alliance for the Future of Kosovo (AAK): 3 municipal council presidents

Turnout in the second round was 31%.
 Basic official results
 Detailed official results
 Preliminary run-off results

Results by municipality

Mitrovica District

Mitrovica

Skenderaj

Vushtrri

Unrecognized results in predominantly Serb communities
The Serb community in northern Kosovo generally boycotted the 2007 local elections. Although elections were formally held and results certified for Leposavić, Zubin Potok, and Zvečan, the turnouts were extremely low, the outcomes were not recognized internationally or in the communities in question, and the winning candidates never took power. The Prishtina authorities ultimately chose to extend the mandates of the previously elected Serb mayors in these municipalities, a decision that the mayors in question dismissed as irrelevant.

Leposavić

Note: There was no second-round vote.

Zubin Potok

Zvečan

External links
  Council of Europe observers' report on the elections

References

Elections in Serbia
2007
Kosovo
2007 elections in Serbia
2007 in Kosovo
November 2007 events in Europe